Meet Mila De Rabba is a Hindi language drama series that aired on Sony Entertainment Television. The story is about a young Punjabi woman's poignant love story and highlights the trials of the bubbly girl who happily accepts her fate, simply to please her family and society. The series premiered on 3 November 2008 and concluded on 21 May 2009. It was produced by Manish Goswami.

Plot 
The story is set within the deep-rooted tradition and customs of Punjabi culture. It begins with the excitement and preparation of the most vibrant and chirpy young woman: Geet. She agrees to marry a man she has never met before. For her, her parents' happiness and honour is important and she will do everything to make her marriage work. So she waits with great excitement until her wedding day, for her prince to come and sweep her away. Everyone who is stepping onto the soil is going to attend the big wedding. As the beautiful bride, Geet is all dressed up in her bridal finery, the entire village awaits the arrival of the baraat and the groom. The couple gets ready to exchange their garlands; the customary gunshot is fired to announce the auspicious moment, a tradition followed over the years, and suddenly all are shocked to witness an untoward incident at the ceremony: The groom was shot and he died upon reaching the hospital.

She gets taunted of being ill fated. Her to be in laws suggest she gets married to the dead groom's elder widower who already has 3 kids.Geet's father politely first rejects the offer and then angrily twice.  After the matter being dragged to the local panchayat, Gyaniji, Geet's uncle vows to get Geet married to his son Major Kulwant Singh Sahni. When Gyaniji calls Kulwant to ask him about this alliance, the terrorists open fire at the base he was at. Kulwant unknowingly agrees to marry Geet as he was defending himself.

After this incident, Kulwant ends up in Pakistan after chasing the terrorists. When the news reached to Geet's village, once again she was taunted of being badluck. This time, she didn't admit defeat and prayed at the Gurudwara for Kulwant's safety. Her prayers were answered when Kulwant escapes and reaches the border although bruised and tired. Once the news had arrived, Gyaniji decided to get Geet married with Kulwant's kripan (sword) as it was practiced in Sikhism.

Once he regains consciousness at the hospital, his mum Mandira breaks the news of him being married to Geet.

When Geet comes to Amritsar, on their first night Kulwant breaks the news to Geet that this marriage was a mistake. Hurt by this, but for the sake of their families, they decided to continue their relationship as friends.

After a series of events, Kulwant tells Geet of his love Meher. They went to meet Meher, but she had already left as her sister had a hole in her heart. Kulwant warms up to Geet and realises he has fallen for Geet. Unknowing of Kulwant's feelings, she goes to Ludhiana in search of Meher. Meanwhile Kulwant has met with an accident and need blood transfusion. Geet coincidentally agrees to donate blood in exchange for information about Dr. Meher.

After knowing Kulwants feelings, Geet proposes that they help Meher as her sister will die soon. Kulwants bregrudgingly agrees, and they all go to Amritsar. After a series of events, the truth is revealed to Divya (Meher's sister) and they leave Amritsar after thanking Geet, Kulwant and their family.

She loves her new husband and her new family. Sadly, she finds that Kulwant has to return to duty at the border. He gets shot on his first day on duty. Kulwant is still alive, and somehow he ends up in Pakistan. He didn't realize that he was there until the Pakistani army came in front of him. The army starts asking him what is he doing in Pakistan and what is he here for. When Kulwant is trying to find his way back home he suddenly gets lost; he sees a woman in a veil and she tells him the way. But after that, it seems like she gave him the wrong directions. He finds the woman's husband and thinks that he is a terrorist. Someone shoots him but the woman thinks that Kulwant shot her husband. Kulwant gets shot by the Pakistani army and he buried and saluted. Geet finds out and doesn't believe that Kulwant died. Then suddenly her kirpan goes missing and then she realizes that Kulwant is no more. She wears white mourning clothing for widowed women. Geet's parents want her to marry Sukhi, but she refuses. She learns that Kulwant is alive. Geet is pregnant. Kulwant is taken from his home to the army headquarters during the welcome party at his home. Everyone is shocked. Where will the fate of Geet and Kulwant's love take the serial?

Cast 
Surilie Gautam as Geet 
Piyush Sahdev as Kulwant Singh (Geet's husband)
Lakha Lakhwinder Singh as Geet's First husband
Shivendra Mahal as Subedar Singh (Geet's father)
Mandeep Bhandar as Lajjo (Geet's mother)
Monaz Mevawala as Dolly (Geet's younger sister)
Asha Sharma as Bebe (Geet's grandmother)
Raza Murad as Gyan Singh (Geet's uncle who is a best friend of her father, now Geet's father-in-law)
Saurabh Raj Jain as Sukhi (Kulwant's cousin, younger brother-in-law of Geet)
Rajeshwari Sachdev as Channi (Geet's aunt)
Kunika Lal as Mandira (Gyanji's wife, Geet's mother-in-law)
Mukul Harish / Kunal Karan Kapoor as Monty (Kulwant's younger brother)
Sunayana Fozdar as Nikki (Kulwant's sister)
Neena Cheema as Bhuaji (Kulwant's aunt)
Priyanka Khandale as Divya Datta (Meher's sister)
Rashmi Desai as Dr. Meher Datta (Kulwant's love)

References

External links 
Official site on SET India

2008 Indian television series debuts
2009 Indian television series endings
Indian television soap operas
Sony Entertainment Television original programming
Television shows set in Punjab, India
Sikhism in fiction